Benzie Central High School is a public high school in Benzonia, Michigan, located at 9300 Homestead Rd. The principal is Kyle Taylor, who started at the beginning of the 2022-2023 school year. The school offers classes for students in grade 9–12 with an addition of a middle school grade 6-8.

History
In the fall of 1962, the school systems of Benzonia/Beulah, Honor, and Copemish were consolidated into the current Benzie Central Schools. Classes were held in the old Benzonia High School until 1964, the year that the current junior/senior high school building was opened. Many modifications have been made to the campus over the years, including classroom additions in 1992 and 1997. In 2001, the latest and most dramatic changes came to the facility with the addition of a state of the art auditorium. In 2002, the old auditorium was converted into a band room.

Academics
Benzie Central offers the following AP courses: Biology, Calculus (AB), Chemistry, US History, and Literature.

In 2011, Benzie Central High School was recognized by the State Department of Education as a school "Beating the Odds!"  Studies were done to find out which schools were performing better than expected, compared to other schools like them.  The analysis compared Benzie Central's outcomes (test scores, statewide top-to-bottom ranking, graduation rate) with other schools of similar factors such as grade levels, locale, and student demographics.

Athletics
MHSAA State Championships:

Boys cross country - 1984,1985,1986,1995,1997,2009,2013,2014
Girls cross country - 1982,1983,1998,2008,2011
Girls track and field - 1999,2011

References

External links

 School district website
 Benzie Central Huskies historical football scores
 Honor Knights historical football scores
 Benzonia Hilltoppers historical football scores

Public high schools in Michigan
Educational institutions established in 1964
Schools in Benzie County, Michigan
1964 establishments in Michigan